Stefano Girelli (born 9 January 2001) is an Italian professional footballer who plays as a midfielder for  club Lecco, on loan from Cremonese.

Club career
Formed on Cremonese youth system, Girelli made his first team debut on 31 July 2020 against Pordenone for Serie B.

On 28 January 2021, he was loaned to Serie C club Pergolettese for the rest of the season. On 12 July 2021, the loan was extended by one year.

On 15 July 2022, Girelli was loaned to Lecco.

References

External links
 
 

2001 births
Living people
Footballers from Brescia
Italian footballers
Association football midfielders
Serie B players
Serie C players
U.S. Cremonese players
U.S. Pergolettese 1932 players
Calcio Lecco 1912 players